Elvenes Chapel is a chapel of the Church of Norway in Salangen Municipality in Troms og Finnmark county, Norway. It is an annex chapel for the Salangen parish which is part of the Senja prosti (deanery) in the Diocese of Nord-Hålogaland. The white, wooden chapel was built in a long church style in 1959 using plans drawn up by the architect Svein Rydland. The church seats about 100 people.

See also
List of churches in Nord-Hålogaland

References

Salangen
Churches in Troms
Wooden churches in Norway
20th-century Church of Norway church buildings
Churches completed in 1959
1959 establishments in Norway
Long churches in Norway